Emmanuel Ellerbee (born November 20, 1996) is an American football linebacker for the Houston Roughnecks of the XFL. He played college football at Rice and was signed by the Atlanta Falcons as an undrafted free agent in 2018.

Early life
Ellerbee was born and raised in Houston, Texas and attended high school at Strake Jesuit College Preparatory. He was a second-team All-District and an honorable mention All-State selection at linebacker for Strake. A Houston-area top 100 football recruit, Ellerbee committed to play football for Rice University after being recruited by Princeton, Harvard, and Texas State.

College career
Ellerbee played four seasons for the Owls, accumulating 273 tackles, 16.5 tackles for loss, five sacks, and five fumble recoveries over the course of his career. Ellerbee was named first-team All-Conference USA for his junior and senior seasons and recorded 238 tackles over that span.

College statistics

Professional career

Atlanta Falcons
Ellerbee was signed by Atlanta Falcons as undrafted free agent on May 2, 2018, but was waived by the team on September 1, 2018.

Los Angeles Chargers
Ellerbee was claimed off waivers by Los Angeles Chargers on September 2, 2018. He made his NFL debut on September 30 against the San Francisco 49ers, playing on special teams. He was waived on October 20, 2018, after appearing in three games with the Chargers.

Seattle Seahawks
Ellerbee was claimed off waivers by Seattle Seahawks on October 22, 2018. He was waived on November 6, 2018, and was re-signed to the practice squad. He was promoted to the active roster on December 1, 2018. He was waived by the Seahawks two days later and re-signed to the practice squad. He was promoted back to the active roster on December 12, 2018.

On July 27, 2019, Ellerbee was placed on injured reserve. He was waived/injured on August 1, 2020, and reverted to the team's injured reserve list after clearing waivers the next day. He was waived from injured reserve on September 29, 2020.

Houston Texans
On October 12, 2020, Ellerbee was signed to the Houston Texans practice squad. His practice squad contract with the team expired after the season on January 11, 2021.

Atlanta Falcons (second stint)
On July 26, 2021, Ellerbee signed with the Atlanta Falcons. He was waived on August 31, 2021, and re-signed to the practice squad the next day. The Falcons signed Ellerbee to their active roster on November 18, 2021.

Houston Roughnecks
The Houston Roughnecks selected Ellerbee in the third round of the 2023 XFL Supplemental Draft on January 1, 2023.

References

External links
Chargers bio
Rice bio

1996 births
Living people
American football linebackers
African-American players of American football
Players of American football from Houston
Rice Owls football players
Atlanta Falcons players
Los Angeles Chargers players
Seattle Seahawks players
Houston Texans players
21st-century African-American sportspeople
Houston Roughnecks players